NVMC may refer to:

 Nassau Veterans Memorial Coliseum, a multi-purpose indoor arena in Uniondale, New York, on Long Island
 National Vessel Movement Center, a military subdivision of the United States Coast Guard